Charles Schlagel "Buck" Becker (October 14, 1890 – July 30, 1928) was a Major League Baseball pitcher who played with the Washington Senators for two seasons.

External links

Major League Baseball pitchers
Baseball players from Washington, D.C.
Washington Senators (1901–1960) players
Atlanta Crackers players
1890 births
1928 deaths